James David Schultz (born July 7, 1972) is an American lawyer and political pundit who was an Associate White House Counsel under Donald Trump, serving from January 20, 2017 to November 24, 2017.  Schultz was part of the legal team at the 2016 Republican National Convention in Cleveland and the Trump Transition Team.  He reported to White House Counsel Don McGahn.

Early life and education
Schultz was born in Atlantic City and grew up in Galloway Township, New Jersey and graduated from Temple University in 1995 before completing his J.D. in 1998 at Widener University Commonwealth Law School.

Career
Schultz had been General Counsel of Pennsylvania from July 2012 to November 2014. He then worked in the White House as ethics lawyer, where he publicly clashed with former Office of Government Ethics chief Walter Shaub.

In November 2017, Schultz returned to Cozen and O'Connor, a Philadelphia-based law firm.  He stated that it was always his plan to leave the White House before the end of the year, and had agreed to these terms with White House Counsel Don McGahn when he started. In September 2020, he left Cozen and O'Connor to lead the Local Government Advocacy Team for the Northeast Region in the Philadelphia and Washington, DC offices of the Holland & Knight law firm. 

Since leaving the White House, Schultz has become a regular commentator on CNN's Anderson Cooper 360°. Schultz advised candidate David McCormick in the 2022 United States Senate election in Pennsylvania.

Personal life
Jim and his wife, Michelle A. Schultz, live in Philadelphia with their two daughters. Michelle formerly served as Deputy General Counsel for SEPTA and currently serves as a member of the Surface Transportation Board.

References

External links
Holland & Knight Profile

1972 births
Living people
American lawyers
People from Atlantic City, New Jersey
People from Galloway Township, New Jersey
New Jersey Republicans
Temple University alumni
Widener University Commonwealth Law School alumni
Trump administration personnel